SCEC can mean:

 Southern California Earthquake Center
 Sydney Convention and Exhibition Centre, an exhibition space in Sydney, Australia
 School City of East Chicago